The Division of Dampier was an Australian Electoral Division in Western Australia. The division was created in 1913 and abolished in 1922. It was named for the navigator William Dampier, the first Englishman to see Australia, and was located in rural Western Australia, including the towns of Northam and Toodyay. It was a safe seat for the non-Labor parties.

Members

Election results

Dampier
Federal politics in Western Australia
1913 establishments in Australia
1922 disestablishments in Australia
Constituencies established in 1913
Constituencies disestablished in 1922